Sutherland Loftus United Rugby League Football Club is a rugby league football club that was formed in 1912 and competes in the Cronulla-Sutherland District Rugby Football League; the junior side of the club was formed in 1963 to coincide with the formation of the CSDJRFL. The club is based out of Sutherland where its headquarters are located and usually draws on the large majority of its junior players from that suburb and the surrounding area of Loftus.

The Sutherland Loftus United club currently field teams from Under 6's age groups all the way up to A Grade.

Notable players

See also

External links
Official website
LeagueNet Sutherland Loftus United website

Rugby league teams in Sydney
Rugby clubs established in 1912
1912 establishments in Australia